Avernus was an ancient name for a volcanic crater near Cumae (Cuma), Italy, in the region of Campania west of Naples. Within the crater is Lake Avernus.

Role in ancient Roman society
Avernus was believed to be the entrance to the underworld, and is portrayed as such in the Aeneid of Virgil. According to tradition, all birds flying over the lake were destined to fall dead, hence the lake’s name was transferred to Greek as  ‚ or "Birdless (lake)". This was likely due to the toxic fumes that mouths of the crater gave off into the atmosphere. In later times, the word was simply an alternative name for the underworld.

On the shores of the lake is the grotto of the Cumaean Sibyl and the entrance to a long tunnel (Grotta di Cocceio, c. ) leading toward Cumae, where her sanctuary was located.  There are also the remains of temples to Apollo and Jupiter.
During the civil war between Octavian and Antony, Agrippa tried to turn the lake into a military port, the Portus Julius.  A waterway was dug from Lake Lucrino to Avernus to this end.  The port's remains may still be seen under the lake's surface.

The term  (plural ) was also used by ancient naturalists for certain lakes, grottos, and other places which infect the air with poisonous steams or vapours. The Cave of Dogs in Italy was a famous example. The most celebrated of these, however, is Lake Avernus.

They were also called mephites. Mephitis was the Roman goddess of noxious vapors, who protects against malaria. The adjective "" means "foul-smelling" or "malodorous".

See also
 Ploutonion, "grotto of Plouton", a Greek term for a mephitic sanctuary

References

External links
 Cyclopædia (1728) article “Averni”.
 Lake Avernus with the Temple of Apollo and a Distant View of Cape Misenum (1819), a very faint pencil sketch by Joseph Turner (see also: Cape Misenum)

Roman mythology
Volcanoes of Italy
Underworld

ca:Avern